The system of orders, decorations, and medals of the Republic of Moldova was established by Law no. 1123 of 30.07.1992, "On the state awards of the Republic of Moldova". This law establishes a system of orders, medals, and honorary titles along with their criteria for award and their order of precedence.
Geography Historia Militum Medal, Republic of Moldova.

Orders
Order of the Republic (Ordinul Republicii)
Order of Stephen the Great (Ștefan cel Mare)
Order of Bogdan the Founder (Bogdan Întemeietorul)
Order of Honour (Ordinul de Onoare)
Order of Work Glory (Gloria Muncii)
Order of Gratitude of the Motherland (Recunoştinţa Patriei)
Order of Allegiance to the Motherland (Credinţă Patriei)
Order of Leadership (Order of Leadership, Republic of Moldova)

Medals
Military Merit Medal
Medal For Bravery
Civil Merit Medal
CGIM International Medal
Medal of Democracy
Mihai Eminescu Medal
Geography Historia Militum Medal
Nicolae Testemiţanu Medal
Dimitrie Cantemir Medal

Honorary titles
People's Artist of Moldova
Master of Art
Master of Literature
The Girl Hero Awards
Merited Person
The Knight of International Illumination
Honored Artist of Moldova
Meşter-Faur

References